This is a list of films produced by the Cinema of Andhra Pradesh in the Telugu language  in the year 2005.

List of released films

January–June

July–December

Dubbed films

References

2005
Telugu
2005 in Indian cinema